The Baire category theorem (BCT) is an important result in general topology and functional analysis. The theorem has two forms, each of which gives sufficient conditions for a topological space to be a Baire space (a topological space such that the intersection of countably many dense open sets is still dense).  It is used in the proof of results in many areas of analysis and geometry, including some of the fundamental theorems of functional analysis.

Versions of the Baire category theorem were first proved independently in 1897 by Osgood for the real line  and in 1899 by Baire for Euclidean space .  The more general statement for completetely metrizable spaces was first shown by Hausdorff in 1914.

Statement
A Baire space is a topological space  in which every countable intersection of open dense sets is dense in   See the corresponding article for a list of equivalent characterizations, as some are more useful than others depending on the application.

 (BCT1) Every complete pseudometric space is a Baire space.  In particular, every completely metrizable topological space is a Baire space.
 (BCT2) Every locally compact regular space is a Baire space.  In particular, every locally compact Hausdorff space is a Baire space.

Neither of these statements directly implies the other, since there are complete metric spaces that are not locally compact (the irrational numbers with the metric defined below; also, any Banach space of infinite dimension), and there are locally compact Hausdorff spaces that are not metrizable (for instance, any uncountable product of non-trivial compact Hausdorff spaces is such; also, several function spaces used in functional analysis; the uncountable Fort space).
See Steen and Seebach in the references below.

Relation to the axiom of choice
The proof of BCT1 for arbitrary complete metric spaces requires some form of the axiom of choice; and in fact BCT1 is equivalent over ZF to the axiom of dependent choice, a weak form of the axiom of choice.

A restricted form of the Baire category theorem, in which the complete metric space is also assumed to be separable, is provable in ZF with no additional choice principles.
This restricted form applies in particular to the real line, the Baire space  the Cantor space  and a separable Hilbert space such as the space

Uses
BCT1 is used in functional analysis to prove the open mapping theorem, the closed graph theorem and the uniform boundedness principle.

BCT1 also shows that every nonempty complete metric space with no isolated point is uncountable. In particular, this proves that the set of all real numbers is uncountable.

BCT1 shows that each of the following is a Baire space:
 The space  of real numbers
 The Cantor set

By BCT2, every finite-dimensional Hausdorff manifold is a Baire space, since it is locally compact and Hausdorff. This is so even for non-paracompact (hence nonmetrizable) manifolds such as the long line.

BCT is used to prove Hartogs's theorem, a fundamental result in the theory of several complex variables.

BCT1 is used to prove that a Banach space cannot have countably infinite dimension.

Proof

(BCT1) The following is a standard proof that a complete pseudometric space  is a Baire space.

Let  be a countable collection of open dense subsets. It remains to show that the intersection  is dense.
A subset is dense if and only if every nonempty open subset intersects it.
Because  is dense,  intersects  consequently, there exists a point  and a number  such that:

Since each  is dense, this construction can be continued recursively to find a pair of sequences  and  such that:

The sequence  is Cauchy because  whenever  and hence  converges to some limit  by completeness.
If  is a positive integer then  (because this set is closed). 

There is an alternative proof using Choquet's game.

(BCT2) The proof that a locally compact regular space  is a Baire space is similar.  It uses the facts that (1) in such a space every point has a local base of closed compact neighborhoods; and (2) in a compact space any collection of closed sets with the finite intersection property has nonempty intersection.  The result for locally compact Hausdorff spaces is a special case, as such spaces are regular.

Notes

References

  
 
  
 
  
  
  Reprinted by Dover Publications, New York, 1995.  (Dover edition).

External links
 Encyclopaedia of Mathematics article on Baire theorem
 

Articles containing proofs
Functional analysis
General topology
Theorems in topology